Elections to the Council of the metropolitan borough of Trafford, Greater Manchester, England were held on 5 May 2011. One third of the council was up for election, with each successful candidate serving a four-year term of office, expiring in 2015. The Conservative Party retained overall control of the council.

Councillors defending their seats in this year were first elected in the  2007 Trafford Council election and the vote share changes in this article are calculated on this basis.

The composition of the council after the election was as follows:

Ward results

Vote share changes are based on the comparable 2007 elections.

Altrincham ward

Ashton upon Mersey ward

Bowdon ward

Broadheath ward

Brooklands ward

Bucklow-St. Martins ward

Clifford ward

Davyhulme East ward

Davyhulme West ward

Flixton ward

Gorse Hill ward

Hale Barns ward

Hale Central ward

Longford ward

Priory ward

4

Sale Moor ward

St. Mary's ward

Stretford ward

Timperley ward

Urmston ward

Village ward

References

 Official Trafford Council Election page

2011 English local elections
2011
2010s in Greater Manchester